Dakshin Madarsha Union :bn:দক্ষিণ মাদার্শা ইউনিয়ন is a union of Hathazari Upazila of Chittagong District.

Geography
Area of South Madarsha: 2,416 acres (9.78 km2).

Location
North: North Madarsha Union

East: Raozan Upazila

South: Shikarpur Union

West: Chikandandi Union

Demographics
At the 1991 census, South Madarsha union had a population of 16,722 and house units of 2587.

Education
 South Madarsha S.S High School (Established 1965)
Akboria School and college.

South Madarsha Model Institute.
Muzaffarabad Govt Primary School.
Rahmania Govt Primary School.

References

 Unions of Hathazari Upazila